Stanley Richard Jaffe (born July 31, 1940) is an American film producer, responsible for movies such as Fatal Attraction, The Accused, and Kramer vs. Kramer.

Background
Jaffe was born to a Jewish family in New Rochelle, New York. He received a Bachelor of Science degree in Economics from The Wharton School, University of Pennsylvania, in 1962. He is the son of Leo Jaffe, film executive and "Hollywood Deal Maker." Leo Jaffe was a close friend of independent producer Sam Spiegel; Stanley Jaffe described how he would find his father and Spiegel at his father's office at Columbia Pictures: "The lights were turned low and there they were, at the end of the table, playing gin."

Career
In 1962, Jaffe joined Seven Arts Associates, and, in 1964, was named executive assistant to the president of Seven Arts. After Warner Brothers purchased Seven Arts in 1967, Jaffe left to join CBS for two years.

After producing Goodbye Columbus, he was appointed executive vice president and chief operations officer of Paramount Pictures in 1970, and within three months was named president of Paramount Television, which post he resigned in 1971 to form an independent production company, Jaffilms, which was "associated" with Columbia Pictures. Jaffilms produced Bad Company (1972) and The Bad News Bears (1976). In 1977, he became executive vice president of worldwide production at Columbia Pictures.

Jaffe returned to independent production with Kramer vs. Kramer in 1979. In 1983, in collaboration with Sherry Lansing (then president of 20th Century-Fox), he started the production company Jaffe-Lansing. In 1991, he was named president and chief operating officer of Paramount Communications, and dissolved his partnership with Lansing. In 1992 he was named successor to Brandon Tartikoff as president of Paramount.

When Viacom purchased Paramount in 1994, Jaffe was forced out and filed a lawsuit against Paramount for $20 million in a stock option dispute. The case was dismissed by the court in 1995, and in 1995 Jaffe's company Jaffilms entered into a production agreement with Sony Pictures Entertainment.

Jaffe had earned the ire of fans of the Star Trek franchise for his role in making a last minute stop to a project that would have built an interactive entertainment facility in the likeness of a full scale Starship Enterprise in Las Vegas.  Jaffe was the only person on the planning committee who opposed the idea, and as CEO of Paramount had the authority to terminate the project.  Instead, Star Trek: The Experience was built in the Las Vegas Hilton. The Fremont Street Experience was built in the place originally planned for the Enterprise project.

Veto of the USS Enterprise complex in Las Vegas

In or around 1992, a consortium of developers put a proposal together with government officials from Las Vegas to build a replica of the USS Enterprise in Las Vegas. The giant scale model of the ship would include restaurants and tours but no hotel or casino. The proposal was also approved by the then-president of Paramount and only needed the approval of CEO of Paramount Studios Stanley Jaffe. After listening to the proposal from all sponsors, Jaffe in the meeting reportedly curtly rejected the proposal on the basis that if unsuccessful, the building would, unlike a movie, be a permanent reminder of failure in the franchise.

Awards and nominations

1988, Academy Awards, nominated for Oscar for Best Picture, Fatal Attraction (1987)
1981, British Academy Film Awards, won BAFTA Film Award for Best Film, Kramer vs. Kramer (1979)
1980, Academy Awards, won Oscar for Best Picture, Kramer vs. Kramer (1979)
1980, David di Donatello Awards, won David for Best Foreign Film (Miglior Film Straniero), Kramer vs. Kramer (1979)

Filmography
He was producer for all films unless otherwise noted.

Film

As director

Filmography (as himself)
Black Rain: Making the Film - Part 2 (2006) (V)
Black Rain: The Script, the Cast (2006) (V)
Black Rain: Post-Production (2006) (V)
Easy Riders, Raging Bulls: How the Sex, Drugs and Rock 'N' Roll Generation Saved Hollywood (2003)
Bravo Profiles (1 episode, 2002)
Finding the Truth: The Making of 'Kramer vs. Kramer' (2001) (V)
HBO First Look (1 episode, 2000) TV episode
The 52nd Annual Academy Awards (1980) (TV)

References

External links
 
 
 Find Out How Las Vegas Almost Saw A Full Scale USS Enterprise Attraction

1940 births
American people of Lithuanian-Jewish descent
Film producers from New York (state)
Living people
Businesspeople from New Rochelle, New York
Golden Globe Award-winning producers
Wharton School of the University of Pennsylvania alumni
Producers who won the Best Picture Academy Award
American film studio executives
American film producers
20th-century American Jews
Paramount Pictures executives
20th Century Studios people
New York Rangers executives
Stanley Cup champions
21st-century American Jews